Buena Vista Bingo Club is Captain Everything!'s fourth full-length album. It was released in Japan in May 2006 on Pyropit Records and in the UK in August 2006 by Household Name Records.

Track listing
Attention Anyone (Called "My Life As Allen Smithee" in the UK release)
Prince Charming
We Used To Be Friends
Bigger Boat
Have A Good'un Girl
Ode To Noya
Bomb Song
You Vs Brain
Running With Scissors
Kerrong
Love Laugh Learn
Circa '95
Why Don't You
We Are The Mardi Gras
Rock Bless You

External links
Album page on Household Name Records website

2006 albums
Captain Everything! albums